Jill Priscilla Carter (born June 18, 1964) is an American attorney and politician who represents Maryland's 41st legislative district of Baltimore City in the Maryland State Senate. She previously represented the same district in the Maryland House of Delegates. She was elected to the Maryland legislature in 2002 and took office in January 2003, resigning in 2017. She was appointed to the state Senate on May 4, 2018.

Early life and education
Carter is the daughter of the late Walter P. Carter, a civil rights activist and leader in the desegregation movement in Maryland in the 1960s and early 1970s. Her mother, Zerita Joy Carter, was a public school teacher specializing in Early Childhood Education. Carter graduated Western High School in Baltimore. Carter received her B.A. in English from Loyola College in Maryland in 1988 and a Juris Doctor from the University of Baltimore School of Law in 1992.

Career
Prior to law school, Carter worked for Baltimore Afro-American newspaper.

Legal career
Carter was admitted to the Maryland Bar in 1993. She has worked as a staff attorney for The Legal Aid Bureau, the Office of the Public Defender, and the Office of the City Solicitor. She is a member of Monumental City Bar Association, the Maryland State Bar Association (MSBA), former member of the Maryland Trial Lawyers' Association and a founding member of the Black Lawyers Group. She is founder and president of the Walter P. Carter Foundation. She was the executive director of the Maryland Minority Business Association in 2002, chair of the Baltimore Branch NAACP Legal Redress Committee.

Carter has individually represented several hundred individuals in the district and circuit in Baltimore City and 6 of Maryland's 23 counties in addition to the hundreds of cases she handled on behalf of the Office of the Public Defender.

Legislative career
Carter was elected to the Maryland Senate November 6, 2018. She is a member of the Senate Judicial Proceedings Committee, Joint Committee on Administrative, Executive and Legislative Review, Joint Committee on Fair Practices and State Personnel Oversight, Maryland Violence Intervention and Prevention Advisory Council, and the Marijuana Legalization Work Group.

From 2017 to 2018 she served as director of the Baltimore City Office of Civil Rights, a position she resigned from The Maryland House of Delegates to accept.

Carter was elected to the Maryland House of Delegates in 2002. She was the third African-American female attorney elected to the Maryland Legislature.
During her first term from 2003 to 2006, she was the only African-American female attorney serving in the Maryland House of Delegates. She was assigned to the House Judiciary committee where she served as chair of the Estates and Trusts Subcommittee, the Legislative Black Caucus of Maryland, and the Women Legislators of Maryland. Carter voted against legalizing slot machines in Maryland in 2005.

Prior to her re-election in 2006, she became a vocal critic of then mayor (and later Governor) Martin O'Malley's "failed policing policies". She posited that the so-labeled, zero tolerance, arrest strategy failed to cause significant reduction in a soaring crime rate in Baltimore City, but, rather, pressured police officers to make tens of thousands of arrests that did not produce criminal charges. She has oft been referred to as a lone voice in the wilderness for her challenges to established politicians on matters of adequate housing for the poor, lead poisoning of children, to adequately fund public education, both in the legislature, and in the Circuit Court for Baltimore City., and, in 2007, calling for a special session of the legislature to deal with the BGE utility rate increase.

In 2016, Carter resigned her seat in the Maryland House of Delegates to accept an appointment as director of the Baltimore City Office of Civil Rights and Wage Enforcement.

On April 30, 2018, Gov. Larry Hogan appointed Carter to fill the Senate seat vacated by Nathaniel T. Oaks, who resigned before pleading guilty to federal corruption charges. After being encouraged to run for the Senate seat, Carter was forced to step down as director of the Office of Civil Rights and Wage Enforcement prior to accepting her appointment. Carter handily defeated her opponent in the primary election and went on to win the general election amassing more than 31,000 votes.

Legislative notes
2005
Sponsored House Bill 1297 in 2005
 Voted against slots in 2005

2006
 Voted for the Healthy Air Act in 2006

2007
Voted for the Clean Indoor Air Act of 2007
Voted in favor of prohibiting ground rents in 2007
Voted in favor of the Tax Reform Act of 2007
Voted against raising sales and services taxes by 20%, i.e. the Transportation and Sales Investment Act of 2007

2013
Co-sponsored HB 860 (Baltimore City Public Schools Construction and Revitalization Act of 2013). Signed by the governor on May 16, 2013, the new law approved 1.1 billion dollars to construct new schools in Baltimore City.

2019
 Voted against the a bill that would have enabled child sexual abuse survivors to file civil lawsuits in Maryland by eliminating the statute of limitations. Maryland currently allows such lawsuits to be brought for up to 20 years after a child has reached the age of majority. Her vote in committee as the lone Democrat, killed the bill. The Maryland House passed the bill by a bipartisan vote of 136-2 without debate.

Awards and recognitions
 In 2006 Carter was listed in Maryland's Top 100 Women in the Daily Record
 In 2009 Carter was the honored as an "Exceptional Woman in Business and Government", at the first annual "Pretty in Pinstripes" Women's History Month celebration.
 In 2008, Carter was the only member of Baltimore City's state delegation to receive a grade of "Outstanding" from the local NAACP.

Campaigns

2007 Baltimore mayoral election
Carter declared her candidacy for the Democratic nomination in the Baltimore mayoral election of 2007. She had criticized the city's mayor and administration for giving unfair advantages to developers and corporations at the expense of the poor and middle class, and had vowed to replace the police department's leadership if elected mayor. In a poll of likely democratic voters released by The Baltimore Sun on July 16, 2007, Carter trailed Mayor Dixon (47%), Councilman Mitchell (15%) and Andrey Bundley (4%) with 2% of those polled. Despite her campaign activities, such as camping out all night on some of the city's most violent street corners, serving hot dogs, having one-on-one conversations with residents, and distributing voter registration forms, Carter's campaign failed to raise enough money to become viable, the political establishment did not support her, and Carter eventually finished fourth in the race with only 2.8% of the vote.

2016 Baltimore mayoral election
After considering a bid for mayor in the 2016 Baltimore Mayoral election, Carter instead endorsed Catherine Pugh, calling Pugh the best choice to stop the "failed and fake War on Drugs, create jobs and opportunities for everyone, and end lead poisoning and not give lip service to it."

2018 state senate election
In 2018, Carter won a contested primary for 41st district senator and was unopposed in the general election.

2020 7th congressional district elections
Carter was a candidate in the 2020 Maryland 7th congressional district special election to fill out the term of the late Elijah Cummings, finishing third in the primary. Carter is also a candidate in the overlapping regular 2020 election for the same congressional seat.

2022 state senate election
Carter was unopposed for reelection as senator for the 41st district in the 2022 primary and general elections.

Election results
2006 Democratic primary for Maryland House of Delegates – District 41
Voters to choose three:
{| class="wikitable"
!Name
!Votes
!Percent
!Outcome
|-
|Jill P. Carter, Dem.
|13,196
|  31.2%
|   Won
|-
|Samuel I. Rosenberg, Dem.
|9,215
|  21.8%
|   Won
|-
|Nathaniel T. Oaks, Dem.
|9,189
|  21.7%
|   Won
|-
|Wendall Phillips
|6,480
|  15.3%
|   Lost
|-
|Kevin Hargrave
|2,095
|  5.0%
|   Lost
|-
|Karen M. Ferguson
|2,116
|  5.0%
|   Lost
|}

2007 Democratic primary for Mayor of Baltimore.

References

External links
 Mayoral campaign Web site
 
 

1964 births
Democratic Party members of the Maryland House of Delegates
Maryland lawyers
African-American state legislators in Maryland
African-American women in politics
Politicians from Baltimore
Living people
Loyola University Maryland alumni
Women state legislators in Maryland
African-American Episcopalians
21st-century American politicians
21st-century American women politicians
Democratic Party Maryland state senators
University of Baltimore School of Law alumni
21st-century African-American women
21st-century African-American politicians
20th-century African-American people
20th-century African-American women
Public defenders